Rajkumar Singhajit Singh, (born 1 May 1935) is a leading exponent, choreographer and a guru of Indian classical dance form of Manipuri, including the Pung cholom and Raslila. He was awarded with the Sangeet Natak Akademi Award in 1984  and  the Padma Shri in 1986 for his contribution to the Manipuri dance. In the year 2011, Sangeet Natak Akademi, India's The National Academy for Music, Dance and Drama, awarded him with its highest award, the Sangeet Natak Akademi Fellowship for his contribution to Indian Dance. In 2014 he was also conferred with the Tagore Award.

Guru Singhajit Singh and his wife Charu Sija Mathur, who is also a Sangeet Natak Akademi Award recipient, have established, Manipuri Nrityashram, a Manipuri dance school, in New Delhi.

Biography

Rajkumar Singhajit Singh was born in a family of dancers and musicians in Manipur. Early in life, he was fortunate to receive his dance education from the finest gurus of Manipuri dance, starting with ‘Guru Ojha Iboton Singh’ (1942–46) for Pung (drum), followed by ‘Guru Amubi Singh’ (1948–54) – Jagoi; ‘Guru Thambal Angou Singh’ (1950–52) - Kartal Chalom; ‘Guru Chauba Singh’  (1952–53) - Kartal Chalom; and with ‘Guru Ojha Gaura Singh’ (1952–53) from whom he learned the martial arts with Sword & Spear, and soon established himself as a dancer, choreographer and artist of repute 

He joined Triveni Kala Sangam, New Delhi, in 1954, as Head of the Manipur Dance Section, and later in 1962, founded the ‘Triveni Ballet’ of which he was Director and Principal Dancer.

Over the year, he and his dance troupe, have extensively travelled to several countries in Europe, the former USSR, North and South America, Japan, West Asia and Africa. Their recent choreography, Ashta Nayika, has received wide recognition, from both viewers and critics alike

Awards
Academy Ratna Award, 2011
 Homi Bhabha Fellowship (1976–1978) 
 Sangeet Natak Akademi Award  (1984)
 Padma Shri  (1986)
 Delhi Sahitya Kala Parishad Award (1975)
 Fellow of Manipur State Kala Academy
 Manipur Sahitya Parishad Nritya Award    (1975)
 Nritya Choodamani from Chennai
 Doctor of Letters (hon) – North Eastern Hills University
 Tagore Award for cultural harmony, 2014 (awarded in 2018)

Bibliography
Manipuri by R K Singhajit Singh, Dances of India series, 2004, Wisdom Tree, . 
 The Martial Arts of Asia: Eliminating Violence

References

External links
 Guru R.K. Singhajit Singh, Charu Sija Mathur website
 An interview with R K Singhajit Singh And Charu Sija Mathur
 R K Singhajit Singh on Manipuri Dance

Indian male dancers
Indian choreographers
Indian classical choreographers
Performers of Indian classical dance
Teachers of Indian classical dance
Manipuri classical Indian dance exponents
Recipients of the Sangeet Natak Akademi Award
Recipients of the Padma Shri in arts
Recipients of the Sangeet Natak Akademi Fellowship
Living people
1931 births
20th-century Indian dancers
Dancers from Manipur